There are several rabbinical works that bear the title "Yalkut" (Anthology):
Yalkut may refer to:

Yalkut Yosef, an authoritative, contemporary work of Halakha
Yalkut Shimoni, an aggadic compilation on the books of the Hebrew Bible
Yalkut Makiri
Yalkut Reuveni
Jud Yalkut (1938–2013), experimental film and video maker
Yalqut Reubeni, a 17th-century collection of midrashim by Rabbi Reuben Hoschke Kohen